The 1930 Oregon State Aggies football team represented Oregon State University in the Pacific Coast Conference (PCC) during the 1930 college football season.  In their seventh season under head coach Paul J. Schissler, the Beavers compiled a 7–3 record (2–3 against PCC opponents), finished in sixth place in the PCC, and outscored their opponents, 208 to 60.  The team played its home games at Bell Field in Corvallis, Oregon.

Schedule

References

Oregon State
Oregon State Beavers football seasons
Oregon State Aggies football